Bae Seung-Jin (born 3 November 1987) is a South Korean footballer who currently plays for Gyeongnam FC.

Bae was a defender on the South Korea national U-20 team playing at the 2007 FIFA U-20 World Cup. He was a part of South Korea U-23 team of 2008 Summer Olympics qualifying. He spent seven years playing in the Japanese League.

He moved to Seongnam FC as Incheon United FC agreed to swap him with Park Yong-ji.

Club statistics

References

External links
 
 Tokushima Vortis Official website 
 
 

1987 births
Living people
Association football defenders
South Korean footballers
South Korean expatriate footballers
Yokohama FC players
Thespakusatsu Gunma players
Tokushima Vortis players
Incheon United FC players
Ansan Mugunghwa FC players
Seongnam FC players
Gyeongnam FC players
J1 League players
J2 League players
K League 1 players
K League 2 players
Expatriate footballers in Japan
South Korean expatriate sportspeople in Japan